Theodore "Ted" Carlisle Landsmark (born May 17, 1946) is an American educator and lawyer. Landsmark is currently Distinguished Professor of Public Policy and Urban Affairs and Director of the Kitty and Michael Dukakis Center for Urban and Regional Policy at Northeastern University. His research interests include diversity in design, environmental design, design education, higher education administration, community-based economic development, public policy, historic preservation, and African American art and artisanry.

Career
Born in Kansas City, Landsmark moved to East Harlem, New York, before beginning his schooling. He attended Stuyvesant High School in New York and St. Paul's School in New Hampshire, and earned his Bachelor of Arts, Master of Environmental Design, and Juris Doctor all from Yale University. He was a political editor for the Yale Daily News, and was part of the Aurelian Honor Society. He then received his Doctor of Philosophy from Boston University in American and New England Studies. Landsmark has received fellowships from the Museum of Early Southern Decorative Arts and the National Science Foundation.

Landsmark served as the president of Boston Architectural College from 1997 to 2014, and as chief academic officer at the American College of the Building Arts from 2015 to 2017. He has been a faculty member at the Massachusetts College of Art, the Massachusetts Institute of Technology, Harvard University, and the University of Massachusetts Boston.

Landsmark has also served as a trustee for numerous arts-related organizations in Boston, including the Museum of Fine Arts, Boston, the New England Foundation for the Arts, Historic New England, the Institute of Contemporary Art, Boston (whose board he chaired), the Design Futures Council, and the Norman B. Leventhal Map Center. In 2014, he was named to the board of directors of the Boston Planning and Development Agency by Mayor Marty Walsh.

The Soiling of Old Glory

Landsmark is widely known for being the subject of the famed photograph The Soiling of Old Glory taken by photojournalist Stanley Forman that won the 1977 Pulitzer Prize for Spot News Photography. On Landsmark's way to a meeting in Boston City Hall, he was met by young demonstrators against the Boston Desegregation Busing Crisis. It depicts a young white teenager, Joseph Rakes, assaulting Landsmark with a flagpole holding the American flag.

In the 1970s, Landsmark was working in Boston as a civil rights attorney and advocate. Initially, Landsmark was working primarily to assist minority contractors in getting opportunities the construction industry. It was not until his assault that he began to focus his efforts in the city's busing crisis.

Following the incident, Landsmark received widespread attention from locals and the media. He parlayed the attention to increase awareness on the racial unrest in Boston. He was later hired by Mayor Raymond Flynn to improve youth and workforce development in the city.

Personal life
Landsmark suffered from polio as a child.

Awards
 2005 - Boston Society of Architects Award of Honor
 2006 - American Institute of Architects Whitney M. Young Jr. Award

See also
List of polio survivors

References

External links
Northeastern profile
The History Makers profile

1946 births
Living people
People from the Kansas City metropolitan area
People from East Harlem
People with polio
Stuyvesant High School alumni
St. Paul's School (New Hampshire) alumni
Yale College alumni
Yale Law School alumni
Boston University alumni
Activists from Massachusetts
American civil rights activists
20th-century American lawyers
21st-century American lawyers
Massachusetts College of Art and Design faculty
Harvard University faculty
Massachusetts Institute of Technology faculty
University of Massachusetts Boston faculty
Northeastern University faculty
Boston Architectural College